The following lists events that happened during 2018 in Cape Verde.

Incumbents
Presidents: Jorge Carlos Fonseca
Prime Minister: José Ulisses Correia e Silva

Events

Sports

Académica da Praia won the Cape Verdean Football Championship

Deaths 

3 March: Ivone Ramos, writer (b. 1926)

References

 
Years of the 21st century in Cape Verde
2010s in Cape Verde
Cape Verde
Cape Verde